Alan Albert Murray (17 June 1940 – 24 May 2019) was an Australian professional golfer.

Murray was born in Sydney, and was educated at North Sydney Boys High School. He played golf worldwide, winning 76 tournaments including the 1961 Australian PGA Championship, 1962 French Open, and the 1967 Wills Masters. He was the 1961 Australian PGA Order of Merit winner. In his only start in a major championship, he finished tied for 19th in the 1964 Open Championship. Murray represented Australia in the 1967 World Cup at Mexico City.

Murray was a Life Member of the PGA of Australia since 2005 and a co-founder, president and Life Member of the Singapore PGA. He was the principal director of Champions Golf Academy, and coached players of all standards in South East Asia for the past 36 years.

Murray died in Perth, Western Australia on 24 May 2019 after a long battle with skin cancer.

Professional wins (51)

Australian circuit wins (19)
1960 Queensland Open, Albury Open
1961 Tasmanian Open, New South Wales PGA, Victorian Open, Australian PGA Championship, NSW Cup
1963 North Coast Open
1965 Tasmanian Open, Victorian PGA Championship, Victorian Open, NBC 3
1966 City of Sydney Open, Wagga City Open
1967 Wills Masters, Wagga City Open
1968 City of Sydney Open 
1969 Tasmanian Open
1971 Forbes Classic

European circuit wins (1)
1962 French Open

Japanese circuit wins (1) 
1963 Dunlop Invitational

Singapore circuit wins (5) 
1973 Keppel Open, Sembawang Open, Rolex Masters
1975 Rolex Masters
1978 Rolex Masters

Other Asian wins (2)
1973 Seletar Open
1974 Tengah Open

Other wins (23)
1958 PGA Golf Assistants State Championships
1960 Albury Open, Lismore Open
1961 NSW Jubilee Open, Pymble Cup, Killara Cup, Asquith Cup, Yarrawonga Open
1962 David Low Invitational Carnoustie (Europe)
1963 Liquor Trades Tournament, Kilara Cup, Ashlar Cup
1964 Oatlands Cup, McKay Open
1965 Eastlakes Cup, Rockhampton Open
1967 Chatswood Open
1969 Cromer Open, Strathfield Open, Rotarua Open, Queenstown Open, Mudgee Open
1973 19th D.S.R.A International Tournament

Team appearances
World Cup (representing Australia): 1967

References 

Australian male golfers
Golfers from Sydney
Sportsmen from New South Wales
Australian expatriates in Singapore
People educated at North Sydney Boys High School
Deaths from skin cancer
Deaths from cancer in Western Australia
1940 births
2019 deaths